Promesas (Promises) is 21st studio album recorded by Mexican performer José José, It was released by RCA Ariola in 1985 (see 1985 in music). It was written, produced and arranged by Spanish producer Rafael Pérez-Botija. This album became the second number-one set on the Billboard Latin Pop Albums by the artist and at the Grammy Awards of 1987 the single "Pruébame" was nominated for Best Latin Pop Performance, losing to "Le Lo Lai" by José Feliciano. For this album the singer received two Billboard awards: Top Latin Artist and Top Latin Album of 1985.

Track listing

Personnel
Rafael Pérez Botija — Arranger, director, realization
Tito Saavedra — Engineer
Joel Soiffer — Engineer

Chart performance

See also
List of best-selling Latin albums

References

1985 albums
José José albums
RCA Records albums
Spanish-language albums